Sam Houston Coliseum was an indoor arena located in Houston, Texas.

Early years
Located at 801 Bagby Street in Downtown Houston, the Coliseum and Music Hall complex replaced the Sam Houston Hall, which was a wooden structure that had been erected on the site for the 1928 Democratic National Convention and torn down in 1936. The Public Works Administration contributed $1,329,508 to the project designed by architect Alfred C. Finn. Groundbreaking ceremonies were held on November 4, 1936. The arena opened in November 1937 and had a capacity of 9,200. It was built in conjunction with the Houston Music Hall, which was adjacent to the Coliseum.

Notable performers
On October 14, 1956, Elvis Presley's concert at the Coliseum ended abruptly, as he and his band were taken away by police escort, just before the end of the show as a mob of about 1,000 teenagers rushed the stage, their instruments being destroyed as a result.

On November 21, 1963, United States President John F. Kennedy gave a speech in the Houston Coliseum, on what would be the last night of his life. John F. Kennedy was assassinated in Dallas the following day.

On August 19, 1965, The Beatles performed at the Coliseum.

On August 20, 1967, James Brown performed at the Coliseum.

On July 10, 1968, The Doors performed at the Coliseum with the opening band Moving Sidewalks, featuring Billy Gibbons who would go on to form ZZ Top less than a year later.

Supergroup Cream played there on October 24, 1968.

Jimi Hendrix played at the venue on June 6, 1970, three months before he died.

Ike & Tina Turner performed at the Coliseum on July 31, 1971.

Trapeze (band) performed at the Colisseum on Saturday, October 21, 1972. The show was recorded and released as a double live album in 2021 called "Trapeze Live in Houston 1972."

Bruce Springsteen & the E Street Band played here November 9, 1974, and again on September 13th & 14th, 1975.

The First National Women's Conference, a milestone for the modern women's movement, was held at the Coliseum in November 1977.

Ozzy Osbourne with Randy Rhoads played at the venue on June 7, 1981 and February 17, 1982.

Stevie Ray Vaughan with Double Trouble (band) performed at the venue on November 24, 1989, on his last tour before Vaughan's tragic death in a helicopter crash nine months later.

Ice Cube and Too Short bought their Straight From The Underground Tour to Sam Houston on December 23, 1990 with Yo-Yo, D-Nice, Kid Rock, Poor Righteous Teachers, and King T.

The Black Crowes played a free concert at the venue on February 6, 1993. The free show was due to security problems that forced the cancellation of a show during a previous Houston visit. The show was broadcast nationally on radio across North America and also was videotaped for the video "Bad Luck Blue Eyes Goodbye". The audio version was released on EPs, dubbed "High in Houston". This would be the last concert performed at the Coliseum before it was demolished.

Sports
In 1946, permanent ice chillers were installed in the floor to accommodate an ice hockey rink for Houston's first pro ice hockey team – the Houston Skippers of the USHL. The Skippers changed their name the following season to the Houston Huskies and called the Coliseum home until their demise in 1949.

Prior to Hofheinz Pavilion being built (on the campus of the University of Houston), the Houston Cougars played home games at the coliseum.

The venue also played host to the Houston Apollos, of the CPHL, from 1965–1969; the Houston Aeros, of the WHA, from 1972–1975 and the Houston Apollos of the CHL, from 1979–1981. The Aeros moved to The Houston Summit, which opened in November 1975 and played their final three seasons there.

The Houston Mavericks, a charter member of the American Basketball Association, played their home games in the Coliseum. However, the Houston franchise was plagued by mismanagement and low attendance. In 1969, the team relocated and became the Carolina Cougars. The Mavericks drew less than 500 fans for most games; their final game in Houston drew just 89 fans.

The Coliseum was also home to Houston Wrestling, run by legendary wrestling promoter Paul Boesch. In an event promoted by Boesch, Jack Brisco defeated Harley Race to win the National Wrestling Alliance World Heavyweight Championship at the Coliseum on July 20, 1973.

Fate
By the 1970s, the arena was starting to show its age. Its fate was effectively sealed in 1971, when the NBA's San Diego Rockets moved to Houston and insisted on building a new arena—what became the Summit—as a replacement. When the Rockets arrived, they would not even consider playing in the Coliseum while the Summit was being built, deeming it inadequate even for temporary use; instead, they played their first few seasons at Hofheinz Pavilion.

Sam Houston Coliseum was demolished in 1998. The former site of the Sam Houston Coliseum was redeveloped into the Hobby Center for the Performing Arts, which opened in 2003.

See also

Sam Houston, general who secured Texas independence and namesake of the coliseum
Sam Houston (wrestler), wrestler who wrestled in the coliseum

References

American Basketball Association venues
Sports venues completed in 1937
1937 establishments in Texas
1998 disestablishments in Texas
Defunct basketball venues in the United States
Defunct indoor arenas in Texas
Demolished music venues in the United States
Demolished sports venues in Texas
Houston Cougars basketball venues
Houston Mavericks
Defunct indoor ice hockey venues in the United States
Sports venues in Houston
World Hockey Association venues
Sam Houston
Sports venues demolished in 1998
Demolished buildings and structures in Houston
Wrestling venues in Houston
Alfred C. Finn buildings